Beyond Utopia is a documentary film about North Korea, directed by Madeleine Gavin. The film debuted at the 2023 Sundance Film Festival. The documentary centers around Sengeun Kim, a pastor who defected from North to South Korea and who facilitates North Korean defections.

References

2023 documentary films
American documentary films